Ted Rank was the pen name used by American writer and photojournalist Jeff C. Tavares, who wrote a satirical humor column in the Venice Gondolier Sun (Venice, Florida) between November 2004 and February 2008. Tavares was also the photo editor and a feature writer at the paper, which is owned by Sun Coast Media Group.

Column
The column, "And now... The News From Ecineville," debuted on Sunday, March 4, 2007, and described fictional people and events that took place in the fictional community of Ecineville and at the fictional newspaper the Ecineville Sun. As satire, the columns were often commentary on the real people and events in the city of Venice, Florida and the real newspaper, the Venice Gondolier Sun. The name "Ecineville" was derived by spelling Venice backwards and adding "ille" to the end.

The column dealt with issues such as the attack of a giant mutant turtle that formed as a result of red tide in the Gulf of Mexico, a report on elderly driving habits in Florida, an Ecineville economic collapse which turned the city into a ghost town, and others.

The column ran three times a week and was last published on Feb. 24, 2008.

References

External links

 Venice Gondolier homepage

American columnists
Living people
Year of birth missing (living people)